John McCormack is an American college baseball coach who has been the head coach of Florida Atlantic (FAU) since the start of the 2009 season.  McCormack was named the Sun Belt Coach of the Year in 2010, and the Owls have appeared in two NCAA Tournaments under him.  Previously, he served as an assistant at FAU from 1991–2008.  McCormack is an alumnus of both Indian River Community College and Lynn University.

Coaching career
McCormack began his coaching career in 1991 and spent 18 years as an FAU assistant under head coach Kevin Cooney.  During that time, the Owls appeared in six NCAA Tournaments.  McCormack handled much of the program's recruiting during his time as an assistant, focusing on players from the South Florida region where FAU is located.  Although he was offered coaching positions at other schools and professional scouting jobs, McCormack chose to stay at FAU.

When Cooney retired at the end of the 2008 season, McCormack was hired to replace him.  The Owls spent his first five seasons in the Sun Belt, winning two regular season titles and one tournament.  They reached the NCAA Tournament in 2010 and 2013, losing in the regional final both times.  In 2010, McCormack was named the Sun Belt Coach of the Year.  In 2013, after losing their opening game, the team reached the decisive seventh game of the Chapel Hill Regional against #1 national seed North Carolina.  The Owls lost, 12–11, in a game that multiple media outlets described as "epic."  Trailing 6–2 in the ninth, the Owls took an 8–6 lead, then gave up two runs in the bottom of the ninth to send the game to extra innings.  They scored three in the top of the 12th, but UNC answered with three in the bottom half and walked off in the bottom of the 13th.  The Owls moved to Conference USA following the 2013 season and missed the conference tournament in their first season in the league. In 2019, John McCormack was inducted into the FAU Athletics Hall of Fame.

Head coaching record
Below is a table of McCormack's yearly records as a collegiate head baseball coach.

Personal
McCormack played youth and high school baseball with former Cincinnati head coach Brian Cleary. McCormack has two children; a sons Conor and Shane.

See also
 List of current NCAA Division I baseball coaches
 Florida Atlantic Owls

References

External links
John McCormack, Head Baseball Coach, Florida Atlantic University Owls

Living people
Indian River State Pioneers baseball players
Florida Atlantic Owls baseball coaches
Lynn Fighting Knights baseball players
Year of birth missing (living people)
Baseball coaches from Florida
Baseball coaches from New York (state)
Sportspeople from Boca Raton, Florida